Melvin Fleur (born 18 February 1982 in Amsterdam) is a Dutch former professional footballer who played for Eredivisie club RBC Roosendaal between 2001 and 2009.

References

External links
Voetbal International profile

1982 births
Living people
Dutch footballers
Footballers from Amsterdam
Association football defenders
RBC Roosendaal players
Eredivisie players
Eerste Divisie players